The  Miss Missouri USA competition is the pageant that selects the representative for the state Missouri in the Miss USA pageant. It is directed by Vanbros and Associates, based in Lenexa, Kansas. In 1993, Missouri joined the Vanbros group of state pageants for the Miss USA and Teen USA system.

Missouri has had only one Miss USA, Shandi Finnessey, who placed as 1st runner-up to Jennifer Hawkins of Australia in the Miss Universe 2004 pageant. The most recent placement was Mikala McGhee in 2022, placing Top 16. Three Miss Missouri USAs have competed at Miss America, including Finnessey.  Six former Miss Teen USA delegates have also won the title, equalling Indiana and Virginia for the most crossovers, although both Indiana and Missouri have had titleholders who competed in a different state at Miss Teen USA.

Mikala McGhee of St. Louis was crowned Miss Missouri USA 2022 on May 1, 2022 at The Mansion Theatre for the Performing Arts in Branson, Missouri. She represented Missouri for the title of Miss USA 2022, placed at the top 16.

Gallery of titleholders

Results summary

Placements
Miss USA's: Shandi Finnessey (2004)
2nd runners-up: Carolyn Carlew (1952), Sandra Lee Marlin (1963), Melanie Breedlove (1998)
3rd runners-up:	Nancy Rebecca Rich (1971), Sandra Percival (1984), Dawn Fonseca (1987)
4th runners-up: Karen Hendrix (1967)
Top 5: Larissa Meek, (2001)
Top 10/12: Dorothy Ann McElven (1974), Nancy LaRose (1975), Donna Hibbitts (1976), Amy Ruth Coverdale (1985), Shelly Lehman (1994), Britt Powell (1995), Amber Seyer (2007), Candice Crawford (2008), Ashley Strohmier (2010), Sydnee Stottlemyre (2016), Bayleigh Dayton (2017)
Top 15/16/20: Alice Jean Porritt (1954), Barbara Jayne Stell (1959), Marilyn Jean Stalcup (1960), Hope Driskill (2011), Megan Renee Kelly (2020), Mikala McGhee (2022)

Missouri holds a record of 26 placements at Miss USA.

Awards
Miss Congeniality: Bayleigh Dayton (2017)

Winners

Color key

References

External links
Official website

Missouri
Missouri culture
Recurring events established in 1952
Women in Missouri
1952 establishments in Missouri